The 1921 Dartmouth Indians football team was an American football team that represented Dartmouth College as an independent during the 1921 college football season. In its first season under head coach Jackson Cannell, the team compiled a 6–2–1 record and outscored opponents by a total of 166 to 103. James Robertson was the team captain.

Schedule

References

Dartmouth
Dartmouth Big Green football seasons
Dartmouth Indians football